Aerovent can refer to:

 A brand name for Ipratropium, an asthma drug
 A brand name for fans built by Twin City Fan Companies, Ltd.